was one of the most favored and most successful military commanders serving Tokugawa Ieyasu in the late-Sengoku period. He is regarded as one of the Four Guardians of the Tokugawa (Tokugawa-Shitennō). along with Honda Tadakatsu, Ii Naomasa, and Sakakibara Yasumasa.

Early life
Tadatsugu was born in 1527 to Sakai Tadachika, a hereditary vassal of the Matsudaira clan of Mikawa Province.

When Tadatsugu came of age, he first served Tokugawa Ieyasu's father, Matsudaira Hirotada. Tadatsugu was the husband of princes Usui and Keyoin, a sister of both of Ieyasu's parents and hence Ieyasu's uncle-in-law.

It is said that after Hirotada's death, in 1551 Tadatsugu served young Ieyasu and led a hostage life in Sunpu.

Service under Ieyasu

In 1558, Tadatsugu accompanied Ieyasu in the Siege of Terabe, and later in 1560 at the Siege of Marune against Oda clan.

In 1563, in the Mikawa Ikkō-ikki uprising, Tadatsugu faithfully followed Ieyasu while many of the Sakai Clan contributed to the uprising.

After 1565, when Ieyasu broke off his ties with the Imagawa clan, Tadatsugu was given command of the Yoshida Castle in eastern Mikawa (present-day Toyohashi).

By 1567, the majority of daimyō forces in the Tokugawa armies were organized in two divisions, each with a separate commander.  Tadatsugu was placed over the forces of 18 Tokugawa daimyō-vassals and his counterpart, Ishikawa Kazumasa, was given command over the forces of 13 daimyō-vassals.  Tadatsugu's qualities of proven loyalty, reliability, and leadership are demonstrably illustrated in this degree of delegated powers and authority.

In 1572, during the Battle of Mikatagahara, Tadatsugu secured the Tokugawa's right flank, seeing his troops being badly beaten by the opposing Takeda forces; and when Ieyasu and his allies retreated to Hamamatsu Castle, Tadatsugu participated in the ruse which mitigated the  effects of Takeda victory in the field; and the Takeda forces withdrew.

In 1575, during the Battle of Nagashino, he led a successful night attack against the Takeda along with Kanamori Nagachika.

In 1578, Tadatsugu's son, Sakai Ietsugu (1564–1619), took over his father's role as castellan of Yoshida Castle.  The ie- in the beginning of Ietsugu's name was a special honor bestowed by Tokugawa Ieyasu, a special reward for special vassals, allowing them to use one of the kanji from his Nanori name.<ref>Plutschow, Herbert. (1995).  "Japan's Name Culture: The Significance of Names in a Religious, Political and Social Context, p.53.]</ref>

In 1584, during the Battle of Komaki and Nagakute, he successfully turned back a move by Toyotomi Hideyoshi forces against Kiyosu Castle, which was led by Toyotomi commander Mori Nagayoshi.

In 1590, during the Odawara Campaign, Tadatsugu was ordered to accompany Tokugawa Hidetada, Ieyasu's son and heir, to Kyoto, where he served as hostage for Ieyasu's loyalty to the Toyotomi during that campaign. After the battle, Hideyoshi ordered to Tokugawa clan to relocate from their ancestral holdings to the Kantō region. Tadatsugu went into retirement, but his son Ietsugu received a 30,000 koku fudai fief at Usui, in Shimōsa Province, and Tadasugu accompanied them there.

Death
Tadatsugu died in Kyoto in the winter of 1596. After Tadatsugu's death, the Sakai clan continued to prosper.  In 1604, his descendants moved to Takasaki Domain (50,000 koku) in Kōzuke Province; in 1616, they relocated to Takata Domain (100,000 koku) in Echigo Province; in 1619, they were transferred to Matsushiro Domain in Shinano Province; and then, from 1622 through to 1868, they were installed at Tsurugaoka Domain (120,000 koku) in Dewa Province. The head of the Sakai clan was ennobled as a "Count" in the Meiji period.

Inokiri sword
In 1560, during that time, it is said Tadatsugu killed a boar with his katana, earning it the name of the Inoshishi-giri or Inokiri (猪切 the Boar Slayer). The blade itself was a work of Masazane from the Tegai school of Nara, and a colleague of the famous Muramasa (or maybe another name for Muramasa himself). Masazane also authored Tonbōgiri (蜻蛉切 the Dragonfly Slayer), the most famous of the Three Great Spears of Japan (天下三名槍), favourite weapon of Honda Tadakatsu, another one of the Tokugawa Shitennō.

Sakai clan genealogy

The Sakai clan originated in 14th century Mikawa Province, claiming descent from Minamoto Arichika. Arichika had two sons: one of them, Yasuchika, took the name Matsudaira; and the younger, Chikauji, took the name Sakai. 
 
Sakai Hirochika, who was the son of Chikauji, likewise had two sons, and their descendants gave rise to the two main branches of the Sakai clan. Tadatsugu was heir to the senior branch of the clan.

References

Further reading
 Appert, Georges and H. Kinoshita. (1888).  Ancien Japon. Tokyo: Imprimerie Kokubunsha.
 Meyer, Eva-Maria. (1999).  Japans Kaiserhof in de Edo-Zeit: Unter besonderer Berücksichtigung der Jahre 1846 bis 1867. Münster: Tagenbuch. 
 Bryant, Anthony J. (1994).  Samurai, 1550–1600.  Oxford: Osprey Publishing. 
 Jansen, Marius B. (1995).  Warrior Rule in Japan,.  Cambridge: Cambridge University Press.  
 Papinot, Jacques Edmund Joseph. (1906) Dictionnaire d'histoire et de géographie du japon''. Tokyo: Librarie Sansaisha.[http://www.unterstein.net/Toyoashihara-no-Chiaki-Nagaioaki-no-Mitsuho-no-Kuni/NobiliaireJapon.pdf ..Click link for digitized 1906 Nobiliaire du japon (2003)
 Plutschow, Herbert. (1995).  "Japan's Name Culture: The Significance of Names in a Religious, Political and Social Context''. London: Routledge.  (cloth)
 Turnbull, Stephen R. (2000).  Nagashino 1575: Slaughter at the Barricades. Oxford: Osprey Publishing. 

Samurai
Daimyo
Sakai clan
1527 births
1596 deaths